André Maman (9 June 1927 – 13 April 2018) was a French politician and Romance philologist.

Born in Oran, French Algeria on 9 June 1927, Maman attended the University of Toulouse and the Sorbonne, then worked as a lawyer. He began teaching in Norway and Canada, and later moved to the United States, joining the Princeton University faculty in 1958. From 1992 to 2001, Maman represented French citizens living abroad on behalf of the Centrist Union group in the French Senate. He was named Commandeur of the Legion of Honour in 2003 and was an officer of the Ordre des Palmes Académiques. Maman died at home in Princeton, New Jersey on 13 April 2018.

References

1927 births
2018 deaths
Pieds-Noirs
French Senators of the Fifth Republic
French philologists
University of Toulouse alumni
French expatriates in Canada
French expatriates in Norway
French expatriates in the United States
Princeton University faculty
20th-century French lawyers
Senators of French citizens living abroad
People from Oran
Romance philologists
Commandeurs of the Légion d'honneur
Officiers of the Ordre des Palmes Académiques
People from Princeton, New Jersey